Aska may refer to:

Locations
Aska, Georgia, a community in the United States
Aska Hundred, or Aska härad, a former administrative division of Östergötland, Sweden
Asika, a town in Odisha, India, also known as Aska
Askas, a village in Cyprus
Aska (restaurant), a two-Michelin Star restaurant in New York City

Music
ASKA (band), an American heavy-metal band
Aska (singer) (born 1958), Japanese singer-songwriter
Aska (group), a Yugoslavian pop group
Aska Yang (born 1978), Taiwanese Mandopop singer

Sports
Aska Cambridge (born 1993), Japanese sprint athlete
Joe Aska (born 1972), American football player
Ivan Aska (born 1990), American basketball player in the Israeli National League

Fiction
Aska, a female ninja from Takara's Cy Girls
Aska (TMNT), a female fighter from the Super Nintendo Entertainment System video game Teenage Mutant Ninja Turtles: Tournament Fighters

Other uses
Aska (Lok Sabha constituency)
Aska (Odisha Vidhan Sabha constituency)
ASKA Insurance Company
Isuzu Aska, a Japanese car

See also
 Asika, a city in Odisha, India
Asuka (disambiguation)